The Pious Fund of the Californias is a fund, originating in 1697, to sponsor the Roman Catholic Jesuit Spanish missions in Baja California, and Franciscan Spanish missions in Alta California in the Viceroyalty of New Spain from 1769 to 1823, and originally administered by the Jesuits. It became the object of litigation between the US and Mexican governments in the 19th century, with the resolution making legal history in The Hague in 1902.

Origin
It originated with voluntary donations made by individuals and religious bodies in Mexico to members of the Society of Jesus, to enable them to propagate the Catholic Faith in the upper Las Californias Province of the Viceroyalty of New Spain, present day U.S. state of California. The early contributions to the fund were placed in the hands of the missionaries, the most active of whom were Juan María de Salvatierra (founder of many missions in Baja California) and Eusebio Francisco Kino (founder of many missions in the Sonoran Desert and Baja California). The later and larger donations took the form of agreements by the donors to hold the property donated for the use of the missions, and to devote their income to that purpose. In 1717 the capital sums of practically all the donations were turned over to the Jesuits, and from that year until the expulsion of the Society of Jesus from Mexico the Pious Fund was administered by them.

In 1768, with the expulsion of all the members of the Society from Spanish territory by the Pragmatic Sanction of King Charles III of Spain, the crown of Spain assumed the administration of the fund and retained it until Mexican independence was achieved in 1821. During this period (1768–1821) missionary work in California was divided, the territory of Upper California being confided to the Franciscans, and that of lower California to the Dominicans. Prior to the expulsion of the Jesuits, thirteen missions had been founded in Lower California, and by the year 1823 the Franciscans had established twenty-one missions in Upper California. In 1821 the newly established Government of Mexico assumed the administration of the fund and continued to administer it until 1840.

In 1836 Mexico passed an Act authorizing a petition to the Holy See for the creation of a bishopric in Alta California, and declaring that upon its creation, "the property belonging to the Pious Fund of the Californias shall be placed at the disposal of the new bishop and his successors, to be by them managed and employed for its objects, or others similar ones, always respecting the wishes of the founders". In response to this petition, Pope Gregory XVI, in 1840, created the Diocese of the Two Californias and appointed Francisco Garcia Diego y Moreno (then president of the missions of the Californias) as the first bishop of the diocese. Shortly after his consecration, Mexico delivered the properties of the Pious Fund to Bishop Diego, and they were held and administered by him until 1842, when General Antonio López de Santa Anna, President of Mexico, promulgated a decree repealing the above-mentioned provision of the Act of 1836, and directing that the Government should again receive charge of the fund.

The properties of the fund were surrendered under compulsion to the Mexican Government in April, 1842, and on 24 October of that year a decree was promulgated by  General Santa Anna directing that the properties of the fund be sold, and the proceeds incorporated into the national treasury, and further provided that the sale should be for a sum representing the annual income of the properties capitalized at six per cent per annum. The decree provided that "the public treasuries will acknowledge a debt of six percent per annum on the total proceeds of the sale", and specially pledged the revenue from tobacco for the payment of that amount "to carry on the objects to which said fund is destined".

Controversy between US and Mexico
There then ensued the Mexican–American War, which was brought to an end by the Treaty of Guadalupe Hidalgo, 2 February 1848. Under its terms, Upper Mexico (Alta California and eastward) was ceded to the United States by Mexico, and all claims of citizens of the United States against the Republic of Mexico, which had theretofore accrued, were discharged by the terms of the treaty. After the Treaty of Guadalupe Hidalgo and indeed for some years before, Mexico made no payments for the benefit of the missions. The archbishop and bishops of the US State of California claimed that as citizens of the United States, they were entitled to demand and receive from Mexico for the benefit of the missions within their diocese a proper proportion of the sums that Mexico had assumed to pay in its legislative decree of 24 October 1842.

By a convention between the United States and Mexico, concluded 4 July 1868 and proclaimed 1 February 1869, a Mexican and American Mixed Claims Commission was created to consider and adjudge the validity of claims held by citizens of either country against the government of the other which had arisen between the date of the Treaty of Guadalupe Hidalgo and the date of the convention creating the commission. To this commission the prelates of California (former Alta California), in 1869, presented their claims against Mexico for such part of 21 years' interest on the Pious Fund (accrued between 1848 and 1869) payable under the terms of the Santa Ana decree of 1842, as was properly apportionable to the missions of 'upper' California state ('lower' Baja California having remained Mexican territory).

Upon the submission of the claim for decision, the Mexican and American commissioners disagreed as to its proper disposition, and it was referred to the umpire of the commission, Sir Edward Thornton, then British Ambassador to the US. On 11 November 1875, the umpire rendered an award in favor of the archbishop and bishops of California. By that award, the value of the funds at the time of its sale in 1842 was finally fixed at $1,435,033. The annual interest on that sum at 6% (the rate being fixed by the decree of 1842) amounted to $86,101.98 and for the years between 1848 and 1869 totaled $1,808,141.58. The umpire held that of this amount, one-half should equitably be held apportionable to the missions of Upper California, located in American territory, and therefore awarded to the United States for the account of the archbishop and bishops of California $904,070.79. This judgment was paid in gold by Mexico in accordance with the terms of the convention of 1868, in thirteen annual installments.

Case before the Permanent Court of Arbitration

Mexico, however, then disputed its obligation to pay any interest accruing after the period covered by the award of the Mixed Claims Commission (that is, after 1869), and diplomatic negotiations were opened by the Government of the United States with the Government of Mexico, which resulted, after some years, in the signing of a protocol between the two Governments on 22 May 1902, by which the question of Mexico's liability was submitted to the Permanent Court of Arbitration in The Hague. This was the first International controversy submitted to the tribunal. By the terms of the protocol, the Arbitral court was to decide first whether the liability of Mexico to make annual payments to the United States for the account of the Roman Catholic bishops of California had been rendered Res judicata by the award of the Mixed Claim Commission, and second, if not, whether the claim of the United States, that Mexico was bound to continue such payments, was just.

On 14 October 1902, the tribunal at The Hague made an award judging that the liability of Mexico was established by the principle of res judicata, and by virtue of the arbitral sentence of Sir Edward Thornton, as umpire of the Mixed Claim Commission; that in consequence the Mexican Government was bound to pay the United States, for the use of the Roman Catholic archbishop and bishops of California the sum of $1,420,682.67, in extinguishment of the annuities which had accrued from 1869 to 1902, and was under the further obligation to pay perpetually an annuity of $43,050.99, in money having legal currency in Mexico.

Mexico continued to make the required annual payment from 1903 to 1912, when transfers were suspended because of the Mexican Revolution. Mexico did not resume payment until 1966, and then negotiated a final lump-sum settlement of US$719,546 to the United States—essentially 53 years of back payments, with interest—in return for the termination of all future obligations with respect to the Pious Fund.

See also
Spanish missions in Baja California
Spanish missions in the Sonoran Desert
Spanish missions in Arizona
Spanish missions in California
The Roman Catholic Church and Colonialism
Spanish colonization of the Americas

Sources
 "Pious Fund Arbitration", The New York Times, September 16, 1902

References

External links

 Unofficial English text of the PCA case in pdf format at the official Permananet Court of Arbitration website.
 Foreign relations of the United States, 1902. Appendix II: United States vs. Mexico. In the matter of the case of the Pious Fund of the Californias

Missions in Mexico
Spanish missions in California
History of Mexico
Mexican California
The Californias
Non-profit organizations based in California
Catholic Church in California
Spanish colonization of the Americas
Permanent Court of Arbitration cases